The 1989 Campionati Internazionali di Sicilia was a men's tennis tournament played on outdoor clay courts in Palermo, Italy that was part of the 1989 Nabisco Grand Prix. It was the 11th edition of the tournament and took place from 25 September until 1 October 1989. Seventh-seeded Guillermo Pérez Roldán won the singles title.

Finals

Singles

 Guillermo Pérez Roldán defeated  Paolo Canè 6–1, 6–4
 It was Pérez Roldán's 1st singles title of the year and the 5th of his career.

Doubles

 Peter Ballauff /  Rüdiger Haas defeated  Goran Ivanišević /  Diego Nargiso 6–2, 6–7, 6–4

References

External links
 ITF – tournament edition details

Campionati Internazionali di Sicilia
Campionati Internazionali di Sicilia
Campionati Internazionali di Sicilia